The Great Britain men's national handball team is the national handball team of Great Britain and is controlled by the British Handball Association which is jointly operated by the England Handball Association and the Scottish Handball Association.

Formed in 1969, the team took part in international competitions from 1972 to 2003. The team was reformed in order to participate in the 2012 Summer Olympics in London, for which it automatically qualified for as the host.

Competitive record

Olympic Games

World Championships

European Championships

IHF Emerging Nations Championship
2015 – 9th place
2017 – 11th place
2019 – 4th place
2023 – Qualified

Team

Previous squads
The British Men's team took part in the 1984 World Championships Group C in Italy. The team finished 10th out of 12.

Source

A squad from 1989

Source

A squad from 2003

Source:

Squad for 2012 Olympic Games

Squad for the 2015 IHF Emerging Nations Championships in Kosovo

Data source

Previous coaches

Current
In the 2008–09 season, all the team players were signed with clubs on the European continent, with the exception of Omar Sani, who played in Egypt.

A special arrangement with insolvent German Handball-Bundesliga side TUSEM Essen provided the side with a number of players after most first-team players had left the club.

To further the development of its players, it also operated the British Handball Development academy in Denmark.

Results

Data sources 1969 ; 1976 ; 2008

See also
Great Britain women's national handball team
Handball at the 2012 Summer Olympics

External links
Official website
IHF profile

References

Men's national handball teams
Handball in the United Kingdom
Handball